The California Manual on Uniform Traffic Control Devices (abbreviated CA MUTCD) is the standard for traffic signs, road surface markings, and traffic signals in the U.S. state of California. It is developed by the California Department of Transportation (Caltrans) Division of Safety Programs "in substantial conformance to" the national Manual on Uniform Traffic Control Devices developed by the Federal Highway Administration. The first edition of the CA MUTCD was published in 2006, replacing an earlier supplement to the national MUTCD. The most recent edition was published in 2014, incorporating the 2009 edition of the national MUTCD. California is one of ten states that publish their own editions of the MUTCD. The CA MUTCD defines the content and placement of traffic signs. Design specifications are detailed on a section of the Caltrans website that is based on the national Standard Highway Signs and Markings (SHSM) document.

History 

In 1952, the California Department of Public Works Division of Highways published a Planning Manual of Instructions. A traffic manual was added to the planning manual in 1955.

In 1969, the California State Legislature deleted all the provisions of the California Vehicle Code that explicitly specified standards for traffic control devices, making the Division of Highways the sole agency responsible for enacting traffic standards in the state in consultation with the California Traffic Control Devices Committee.

In 1972, the traffic manual became a standalone document, titled simply Traffic Manual. A metric version was published in 1996 by the then-renamed Department of Transportation's Division of Traffic Operations.

In 2000, Caltrans and the California Traffic Control Devices Committee undertook an effort to reconcile the Traffic Manual with the national MUTCD. In 2004, these efforts resulted in the adoption of the 2003 edition of the national MUTCD along with a California supplement, which replaced various chapters of the 1996 Traffic Manual pertaining to traffic signs and signals.

In 2006, Caltrans once again published its own standard as the CA MUTCD to incorporate the supplement's guidance into the main text of the standard. Subsequent editions were published in 2010, 2012, and 2014. Caltrans made nearly annual revisions to the document from then through at least 2021.

Legal authority 
California Vehicle Code section 21400 provides for Caltrans to adopt a state-specific edition of the MUTCD. Section 21401 legally requires all traffic control devices on streets and highways to conform to these standards. Therefore, the manual is used by state, county, and municipal highway departments, as well as by private construction firms, to ensure that the traffic control devices they use conform to the state standard. Some parts of the national MUTCD have not been incorporated into the CA MUTCD. Where there is a conflict between the two standards, the CA MUTCD takes precedence within California. Several Caltrans-specific signs also appear in the California Driver Handbook, the driver's education handbook published by the California Department of Motor Vehicles in 13 languages.

Development 
The CA MUTCD is developed by Caltrans in consultation with the California Traffic Control Devices Committee (CTCDC) and other stakeholder agencies. The CTCDC is the successor to the California State Sign Committee, which was originally responsible for highway signage from 1933 to 1947. The ten-member committee consists of representatives designated by Caltrans, the League of California Cities, the County Engineers Association of California, the Automobile Club of Southern California, AAA Northern California, Nevada & Utah, and the California Highway Patrol.

Contents 

The CA MUTCD and sign specifications are organized similarly to the MUTCD and SHSM, respectively. Each of the California sign specifications is assigned an alphanumeric designation and organized according to the same series found in the SHSM. The sign designation for a state-specific sign includes a "(CA)" after the sign number. The CA MUTCD also defines some state-specific series:

 Series G: California Guide
 Series SG: California Special Guide
 Series S: California Special Information
 Series SC: California Special Temporary Traffic Control
 Series SR: California Special Regulation
 Series SW: California Special Warning

References

External links 

 
 California sign charts
 California sign specification drawings
 California Traffic Control Devices Committee

Manual on Uniform Traffic Control Devices
Road infrastructure in California
Publications of the Government of California
Publications established in 2006
California Department of Transportation